James Allan Coutts  (May 16, 1938 – December 31, 2013) was a Canadian lawyer, businessman, and former advisor to two prime ministers.

Biography
Born in High River, Alberta, he was raised in Nanton, Alberta. He received a Bachelor of Arts degree in 1960 and a law degree in 1961 from the University of Alberta and an MBA from the Harvard Business School in 1968. He was called to Bar of Alberta in 1962.

From 1961 to 1963, he practiced law in Calgary, Alberta. From 1963 to 1966, he was a Secretary to Liberal Prime Minister Lester B. Pearson. After receiving his MBA, he was a Consultant with McKinsey & Company from 1968 to 1970. From 1970 to 1975, he was a Partner with The Canada Consulting Group. From 1975 to 1981, he was the Principal Secretary to Prime Minister Pierre Elliott Trudeau.

In 1981, Trudeau appointed Liberal MP Peter Stollery to the Senate so Coutts could run for the House of Commons of Canada in what was thought of as the safe Ontario riding of Spadina.  The plan backfired when Coutts narrowly lost to New Democrat Dan Heap despite personal interventions from Trudeau.  Coutts ran again, but lost by a heavier margin in the 1984 election.

He subsequently left politics and entered business with an international career in industrial explosives. He was a principal of Lowther Consultants Limited and the chairman and chief executive officer of CIC Canadian Investment Capital Limited.

He was also a philanthropist and a major donor to the University of Lethbridge.

He was a member of the Board and Foundation of The Hospital for Sick Children and was a co-founder of the W.O. Mitchell Literary Prize.

In 2001, he was made a Member of the Order of Canada.

Coutts died of cancer on December 31, 2013.

Electoral history

Archives 
There is a James A. Coutts fonds at Library and Archives Canada.

References

Sources

External links 
 James Allan Coutts  at The Canadian Encyclopedia

1938 births
2013 deaths
Canadian businesspeople
Harvard Business School alumni
Lawyers in Alberta
Candidates in the 1984 Canadian federal election
McKinsey & Company people
Members of the Order of Canada
Members of the United Church of Canada
People from Foothills County
People from the Municipal District of Willow Creek No. 26
University of Alberta alumni
People from High River
Deaths from cancer in Ontario
Liberal Party of Canada candidates for the Canadian House of Commons